National Defense University (NDU) is a military academy located in Bade District, Taoyuan City, Taiwan.

The NDU offers a wide range of academic programs, including undergraduate, graduate, and doctoral programs. The undergraduate program is the Military Academy, which provides four-year undergraduate education and training to prepare cadets for leadership roles in the military.

History
The university was established in May 2000 by merging Armed Forces University, National Defense Management College, Chung Cheng Institute of Technology, and National Defense Medical Center.

Colleges
 War College 
 Army Command and Staff College 
 Naval Command and Staff College 
 Air Command and Staff College 
 Political Warfare College 
 Management College 
 Institute of Technology

List of presidents

Armed Forces University
 Pi Tsung-gan (August 1959 – August 1964)
  (16 August 1968 – 1 December 1969)
 Chiang Ching-kuo (16 August 1975 – 6 April 1980)
  (7 April 1980 – 31 December 1983)
  (1 January 1984 – 30 April 1987)
  (1 May 1987 – 4 December 1989)
  (5 December 1989 – 30 April 1992)
 Yeh Chang-tung 葉昌桐 (1 May 1992 – 30 April 1994)
  (1 May 1994 – 30 June 1996)
  (1 July 1996 – 31 January 1999)
  (1 February 1999 – 7 May 2000)

National Defense University
 Hsia Ying-chou (8 May 2000 – 31 January 2002)
 Chen Chen-hsiang (1 February 2002 – 31 August 2003)
  (1 September 2003 – 31 May 2005)
 Fei Hung-po 費鴻波 (1 June 2005 – 15 February 2006)
 Tseng Jing-ling (16 February 2006 – 31 October 2008)
  1 November 2008 – 15 May 2011) 
 Adm. Chen Yeong-kang (16 May 2011 – 31 August 2012)
 Gen. Chiu Kuo-cheng (1 September 2012 – 31 July 2014)
 Cheng Te-mei (1 August 2014 – 31 October 2015)
  (1 November 2015 – 31 March 2019)
 Wang Shin-lung (1 April 2019 – 30 June 2021)
 Chang Che-ping (since 1 July 2021)

Transportation
The university is accessible South West from Yingge Station of Taiwan Railways.

Notable alumni
 Chen Chao-min, Minister of National Defense (2008-2009)
 Feng Shih-kuan, Minister of National Defense (2016–2018)
 Lee Shying-jow, Minister of Veterans Affairs Council (2016–2018)
 Tseng Jing-ling, Minister of Veterans Affairs Council (2009–2013)
 Yang Kuo-chiang, Director-General of the National Security Bureau (2015–2016)
 Gen SM Shafiuddin Ahmed, SBP, OSP, ndu, psc, PhD; Chief of Army Staff of Bangladesh Army (2021–Current)

See also
 List of universities in Taiwan

References

External links 
 

 
Space program of Taiwan
2000 establishments in Taiwan
Military academies of Taiwan
Educational institutions established in 2000